The Sprinto is a French trailerable sailboat that was designed by Joubert Nivelt Design as a racer and first built in 2000.

Production
The design was built by Archambault Boats of Dangé-Saint-Romain, France, starting in 2000, but it is now out of production. Archambault, which had been founded in 1967, went out of business in 2015.

The design was changed through its production run, incorporating design changes over time.

Design
The Sprinto is a recreational keelboat, built predominantly of fibreglass. It has a fractional sloop rig with aluminum spars, a deck-stepped mast, wire standing rigging and a single set of swept spreaders. The hull has a plumb stem, a sharply reverse transom, a transom-hung rudder controlled by a tiller and a swing keel. Later models had a drop keel and a revised sailplan layout. It mounts a retractable bowsprit, displaces  and carries  of ballast.

The boat is normally fitted with a small outboard motor for docking and manoeuvring.

For sailing downwind the design may be equipped with an asymmetrical spinnaker.

See also
List of sailing boat types

References

External links

Keelboats
2000s sailboat type designs
Sailing yachts
Trailer sailers
Sailboat type designs by Joubert-Nivelt
Sailboat types built by Archambault Boats